The 2007 Copa América knockout stage was the elimination stage of the Copa América, following the group stage. It began on 7 July 2007 and consisted of the quarter-finals, the semi-finals, the third-place play-off, and the final held at the Estadio José Pachencho Romero on 15 July, in Maracaibo. No extra time was to be played if any match in the final stages finished tied after regulation; the match would go straight to a penalty shoot-out.

All times are in local, Venezuela Time (UTC−04:00).

Qualified teams
The top two placed teams from each of the three groups, plus the two best-placed third teams, qualified for the knockout stage.

Bracket

Quarter-finals

Venezuela v Uruguay

Chile v Brazil

Mexico v Paraguay

Argentina v Peru

Semi-finals

Uruguay v Brazil

Mexico v Argentina

Third-place match

Final

References

External links
2007 Copa América at RSSSF

Final stages
2007 in Peruvian football
Venezuela at the 2007 Copa América
2006–07 in Uruguayan football
Brazil at the 2007 Copa América
Chile at the 2007 Copa América
2006–07 in Mexican football
Argentina at the 2007 Copa América
2007 in Paraguayan football